"Break It Down Again" is a song by British band Tears for Fears, released as the first single from their fourth studio album, Elemental (1993). It is one of the band's later songs with the typical late 1980s sound, using synthesizers. The song was the second single released after the departure of Curt Smith from the band (after "Laid So Low" in 1992).
 
"Break It Down Again" was the last international hit in Tears for Fears' career, marking a notable decline in their popularity in the following singles. The song reached number 20 in the United Kingdom, number 25 in the United States, and the top 40 in several other countries. It topped the US Billboard Modern Rock Tracks chart and was particularly successful in Canada and Iceland, reaching numbers four and two respectively; the single also entered the top 10 in Italy.

Background
As with the Elemental album, the song featured Roland Orzabal with peripheral Tears For Fears band members Alan Griffiths and Tim Palmer, plus backing vocals by ex-Graduate bandmate John Baker. "Break It Down Again" is the only song that has regularly remained in live setlists following Smith's return.

B-sides
The CD single included two non-album B-sides, of which "Schrodinger's Cat", the first in a number of songs by Orzabal dealing with modern physics, has acquired a cult status.

In addition to the mentioned references, the song also quotes the guitar riff from "Sgt. Pepper's Lonely Hearts Club Band". The chorus line was already hinted at in the Tears for Fears cover of "Ashes to Ashes". The sample of a train announcer saying "Last train to Norwich" that runs through "Schrodinger's Cat" appeared again on the song "Master Plan".

The song "Bloodletting Go" is one of the first songs written by Orzabal and Griffiths. Both songs were later included on the B-sides compilation Saturnine Martial & Lunatic.

Music video
The music video shows Orzabal, Griffiths, and Gail Ann Dorsey (who joined Tears for Fears as a touring member) performing the song on the desert El Mirage Lake, California, where the "Break It Down Again" single and the Elemental album covers were taken. The video was directed by Dani Jacobs.

Track listings
7-inch single
 "Break It Down Again"
 "Bloodletting Go" (Roland Orzabal, Alan Griffiths)

UK CD single
 "Break It Down Again"
 "Bloodletting Go" (Orzabal, Griffiths)
 "Schrodinger's Cat" (Orzabal, Griffiths)
 "Break It Down Again" (karaoke version)

Charts

Weekly charts

Year-end charts

See also
 List of Billboard number-one alternative singles of the 1990s

References

Tears for Fears songs
1993 singles
1993 songs
Mercury Records singles
Songs written by Roland Orzabal